David Shaw-Smith (20 January 1939 – 16 January 2021) was an Irish filmmaker. With his wife Sally, he produced and directed the acclaimed documentary series Hands. He made over 138 television documentaries during his career.

In March 2013, 1,800 of his film cans from his archive were moved from his home and barn and put into the RTÉ Archives.

Filmography 
Connemara & Its Ponies, 1971
Dublin: A Personal View
Village, 1974
Hands, 1977
Patterns, 1979
The Angling Experience – Irish Spring Salmon, 1988
The Angling Experience – Irish Mayfly, 1988
The Angling Experience – Irish Summer Salmon, 1988
The Angling Experience – Ireland's Fighting Pike, 1988

Books
Ireland's Traditional Crafts (Thames & Hudson, 1984)

References 

1939 births
2021 deaths
Irish filmmakers